The Northwest Montana History Museum, at the restored Central School building in Kalispell, Montana, United States, is a history museum featuring exhibits that illuminate the history of the Northwest Montana region and Flathead Valley.

Operated by the non-profit Northwest Montana Historical Society, the Northwest Montana History Museum is housed in the  Richardsonian Romanesque-style four-story stone and brick Central School building, constructed in 1894 and completely restored and renovated in the late 1990s.

Current permanent exhibits focus on Montana pioneer Frank Bird Linderman, the Northwest Montana timber industry, Northwest Native American culture, Flathead Valley history, Central School, and the turn-of-the-century community of Demersville.

External links
Museum website
Montana Travel Information

History museums in Montana
Historical society museums in the United States
Native American museums in Montana
Museums in Kalispell, Montana
School buildings completed in 1894
Richardsonian Romanesque architecture in Montana
1894 establishments in Montana